Methylacrylate may refer to:

 Methacrylate esters
 Methyl acrylate
 The anion of methacrylic acid